Vasili Aleksandrovich Brovin (born 25 March 1982) is a former Russian professional footballer.

Club career
He made his debut in the Russian Premier League in 2003 for FC Rostov.

Honours
 Russian Cup finalist: 2003.

References

1982 births
Sportspeople from Yekaterinburg
Living people
Russian footballers
FC Lada-Tolyatti players
FC Rostov players
FC Baltika Kaliningrad players
FC KAMAZ Naberezhnye Chelny players
FC Dynamo Stavropol players
Russian Premier League players
FC Gornyak Uchaly players
FC Sodovik Sterlitamak players
FC Khimki players
FC Taganrog players
FC Armavir players
Association football midfielders
FC Lukhovitsy players
FC Mashuk-KMV Pyatigorsk players